The Municipal Corporation Chandigarh (MCC), also known as Chandigarh Municipal Corporation, is the civic body that governs the city of Chandigarh, the capital of Punjab and Haryana.

History
The Municipal Corporation of Chandigarh, India was formed within the Union Territory of Chandigarh under the Punjab Municipal Corporation Act in 1976. The corporation was later extended to the union territory, Chandigarh, by the Punjab Municipal Corporation Law (Extension to Chandigarh) Act, 1994 (Act No.45 of 1994), which came into effect on 24 May 1994. Under a provision of Section 47 of the act, M.P. Tyagi was appointed as the first Commissioner of the Corporation w.e.f. on 19 June 1995. Tyagi continued to exercise mayoral powers until 23 December 1994, when the first meeting of the elected body of the Corporation was held. Tyagi was succeeded as Commissioner by S.K. Gathwal on 8 August 1996.

In the Municipal Corporation, BJP candidate Arun Sood defeated Congress' Mukesh Bassi by 21–15 votes for the post of Mayor, while BJP's Davesh Moudgil and SAD's Hardeep Singh defeated Congress' Darshan Garg and Gurbax Rawat for the posts of Sr. Deputy Mayor and Deputy Mayor, respectively, in the Municipal Corporation's mayoral polls in January 2016.

After the 2016 Chandigarh Municipal Corporation election in January 2017, BJP's Asha Kumari Jaswal was elected as the mayor, BJP's Rajesh Kumar Gupta and Anil Dubey were elected as senior deputy mayor and deputy mayor respectively. In January 2019, Mayor elections, BJP candidate Rajesh Kumar Kalia was elected as the Mayor by defeating the independent candidate Satish Kainth by securing 16 votes out of the total 27 votes.

Ravi Kant Sharma served as Mayor of Chandigarh till 2021 upon succeeding Raj Bala Malik.

2021 Chandigarh Municipal Corporation election was held on 24 December 2021. Sarbjit Kaur was elected as the Mayor of the civic body after the elections.

Mayor
Mayor is the Head of the Municipal Corporation. Of the five-year term of the Municipal Corporation, Office of the Mayor, for the first and fourth years, is reserved for women.

Sarbjit Kaur of Bhartiya Janata Party is the incumbent mayor of Chandigarh.

List of Mayors of Chandigarh

Composition 
According to the Municipal Corporation Chandigarh's website, the Corporation is composed of the following members:

Administration 
The Commissioner is the apex of the municipal administrative hierarchy that runs its administration. He is a senior government official (usually an I.A.S officer) and is appointed by the Central government. He is the chief executive officer who is responsible for the passing and implementation of the annual Municipal Corporation budget, its policies and programmes. All personnel of the Municipal Corporation work under the Commissioner's supervision and control.

The current Municipal Commissioner of the Municipal Corporation Chandigarh is Anindita Mitra.

Chandigarh being a city-state, and a Union Territory does not have a legislative assembly of its own, even though it hosts the legislative assemblies of two states Punjab & Haryana, being a common capital of both states. It has its own Municipal Corporation (MCC), which acts as the local governing authority of the City Beautiful (Chandigarh). The MCC is one of the most powerful local authorities in the Republic of India as it serves both as a regional and local authority.

Departments

Composition of MCC House

Civic utilities 
The prime responsibilities of the civic body are to ensure cleanliness and sanitation in the city, illumination of street lights, maintenance of parks, and sewerage disposal.

Water Supply
The city has both brick and pipe sewers laid in four phases. In September 2020, the civic body announced that it would upgrade and renew the 50-year-old sewerage system. The pilot project for the 24x7 water supply is expected to begin in Chandigarh in May 2021, which was initially to start in September 2020 and end in March 2022. On 8 April 2021, Chandigarh Smart City Ltd (CSCL) opened the bid by the joint venture firm between SB Engineering and Tap Presstressed Pvt Ltd that quoted a value lower than the reserved price of 162 crores. The CSCL board is yet to take the final decision.

Tariffs
In 2021, the BJP ruled corporation had increased the water tariff by 200 times. This created widespread discontent among the residents. AAP promised to provide free water up to 20,000 litres to each family in Chandigarh every month.

In 2021, there was an acute shortage of parking spaces. As the problem aggravated BJP led corporation increased the parking charges in the city. The increase in the waste collection charges, water tariff and property tax rates during the last five years made the voters against the incumbent BJP.

The increased expenditure for the basic amenities and these tariff hikes led to a strong discontent among the voters.

Cleanliness
In 2016, Chandigarh was the second cleanest city of India. In 2016 BJP came to power in the corporation. In the years that followed, garbage from the city was not disposed of properly. The lack of a proper process or mechanism led to the garbage piled up at the Dadu Majra garbage dump site.

In 2021, Chandigarh fell to 66 positions in the cleanest cities in India. The city had always taken pride in the fact that it was one of the cleanest cities in the country. The fall in cleanliness became an important poll issue. The residents were upset with the downfall in the cleanliness.

Covid-19 
The government's handling of the COVID-19 pandemic in India damaged BJP's image as the voters felt that they were not given desired help in getting the hospital beds and medical oxygen from their elected representatives. The sitting Councillors were found to be unapproachable when the public needed support. No major relief measure was taken by the local government.

References

External links
 Official Logo

Municipal corporations in India
1994 establishments in Chandigarh
Politics of Chandigarh